Niko Qafzezi (1914–1998) was an agronomist and pedagogue from Albania.

Early life

Dr. Niko Qafzezi was born in Korca on 26 October 1914 and died on 30 November 1998 in Tirane. He was the father of Leon Qafzezi and Robert Qafzezi with Amalia Qafzezi (Zheji), whom he married in 1952 in Tirane.

Career

After the end of the French Lyceum of Korçë, went to study at the Faculty of Agriculture in Perugia, Italy, where they ended under the auspices of Prof. Girolamo Azzi. He returns home and works as an agronomist in Kosovo until 1943. From 1943 to 1952 works in the Ministry of Agriculture as Chairman of the Agrarian Production. Shortly after the opening of the Higher Institute of Agriculture of Kamza, today "Agricultural University of Tirana", appointed as lecturer and works for about 20 years at the Institute. Besides teaching, Qafzezi will serve as the Chief of Department, and conducting experiments at the Institute as well as districts of the country with elite wheat seeds in collaboration with Italian Professor Cirillo Maliani. Very soon these experiments lead to increased wheat yields in Albania. He died in 1998 at the age of 84 years in Tirana.

Titles and honors
Qafzezi holds a Doctor of Science, professor and was honored by Parliament and decorated with "Medal of Labor" first class and twice with the Order "Naim Frashëri" first class.

Activities

Qafzezi was the author of many textbooks of the Faculty of Agronomy as "Fitoteknia" I and II, and Books "The culture of cotton." He drew published several scientific articles in the field of agriculture in Albanian and foreign periodicals, as the "Dictionary of Agriculture" in four languages: English, Latin, Italian and Russian. This dictionary was published in Tirana in 1978, it contains about 20 thousand words and 852 pages. Besides their manuscript left several works. They deserve mention "Encyclopedia of Agriculture" by about 5000 pages as well as several studies in the field of etymology for agriculture.

References

External links
Eagle Film Albania-Niko Qafzezi in 100 Anniversary of Born (Youtube)

Albanian agronomists
20th-century Albanian scientists
People from Korçë
1914 births
1998 deaths
Academic staff of the Agricultural University of Tirana
Albanian non-fiction writers
20th-century non-fiction writers
20th-century agronomists